Ceratozamia whitelockiana is a species of plant in the family Zamiaceae. It is endemic to Mexico, where it is known only from Metates and Chiapan in Oaxaca state. Only two subpopulations have been found, with a total population of about 2200 individuals. The habitat is threatened by conversion to plantations using slash-and-burn techniques.

This cycad has a cylindrical trunk about 20 to 30 centimeters long. The leaves are up to 2.5 meters in length and have 30 to 40 pairs of leaflets. The plant was named for cycad expert Loran Whitelock.

References

whitelockiana
Endemic flora of Mexico
Flora of Oaxaca
Endangered plants
Endangered biota of Mexico
Plants described in 1995
Taxonomy articles created by Polbot
Flora of the Sierra Madre de Oaxaca